Daniel Nestor and Nenad Zimonjić were the two-time defending champions, but lost in the second round to Chris Eaton and Dominic Inglot.

Jürgen Melzer and Philipp Petzschner defeated Robert Lindstedt and Horia Tecău in the final, 6–1, 7–5, 7–5, to win the gentlemen's doubles title at the 2010 Wimbledon Championships.

Seeds

  Daniel Nestor /  Nenad Zimonjić (second round)
  Bob Bryan /  Mike Bryan (quarterfinals)
  Lukáš Dlouhý /  Leander Paes (second round)
  Mahesh Bhupathi /  Max Mirnyi (third round)
  Łukasz Kubot /  Oliver Marach (first round)
  Mariusz Fyrstenberg /  Marcin Matkowski (second round)
  Wesley Moodie /  Dick Norman (semifinals)
  Julian Knowle /  Andy Ram (third round)
  František Čermák /  Michal Mertiňák (second round)
  Simon Aspelin /  Paul Hanley (second round)
  Marcel Granollers /  Tommy Robredo (quarterfinals)
  John Isner /  Sam Querrey (withdrew)
  Mardy Fish /  Mark Knowles (first round)
  Julien Benneteau /  Michaël Llodra (quarterfinals)
  Marcelo Melo  /  Bruno Soares (second round)
  Robert Lindstedt /  Horia Tecău (final)

John Isner and Sam Querrey withdrew due to Isner's fatigue after his first round singles match against Nicolas Mahut.

Qualifying

Draw

Finals

Top half

Section 1

Section 2

Bottom half

Section 3

Section 4

References

External links

2010 Wimbledon Championships – Men's draws and results at the International Tennis Federation

Men's Doubles
Wimbledon Championship by year – Men's doubles